"Dude, Where's My Ranch?" is the eighteenth episode of the fourteenth season of the American animated television series The Simpsons. It originally aired on the Fox network in the United States on April 27, 2003. It was written by Ian Maxtone-Graham and was the first episode directed by Chris Clements.

Plot
At Christmas time, the Simpsons go caroling around Springfield before the Blue-Haired Lawyer orders them to stop, citing copyright infringement. In response, Homer tries to write his own carol but when Ned Flanders tries to help, he soon creates an anti-Flanders song titled "Everybody Hates Ned Flanders". The song becomes so popular that the family, annoyed by its constant presence, leave for a dude ranch. At the ranch, Lisa meets a cowhand named Luke Stetson, with whom she begins to bond. Meanwhile, Homer and Bart meet a tribe of Native Americans who want a beaver dam removed so they can reclaim their land. They are confronted by the beavers while attempting to dismantle the dam and eventually destroy it after luring the beavers away.

Lisa overhears Luke expressing his love to a girl named Clara over the phone. When a jealous Lisa encounters her, she tricks her into going the wrong way on the path to a dance. Lisa finds out that Clara is Luke's sister and runs to the beaver dam with Bart. They find Clara standing on a rock in the middle of a torrential river. Bart taunts some beavers and scales a tree; the beavers chew through the tree, causing it to fall and create a bridge that Clara can cross. When Lisa comes clean about what happened to Clara, Luke is offended and leaves her. As the Simpsons return to Springfield, they hear a song entitled "The Moe Szyslak Connection" on the radio, sung by Moe Szyslak, and turn around to spend another week at the ranch.

Reception
On November 2, 2004, the episode was released in the United States on a DVD collection titled The Simpsons Christmas 2, along with the season twelve episodes "Homer vs. Dignity" and "Skinner's Sense of Snow" and the season fifteen episode 'Tis the Fifteenth Season", despite Christmas only playing a minor role in the first act and not being brought up again afterward.

Reviewing the DVD, Brian James of PopMatters wrote that "Dude, Where's My Ranch?" displays "the series’ nefarious habit of using the first third of the episode as a clearinghouse for disconnected jokes before actually beginning the plot, a blight made that much more glaring here since the only connection to Christmas comes early with the rest not even taking place in winter."

References

External links

2003 American television episodes
American Christmas television episodes
David Byrne
The Simpsons (season 14) episodes